Harrisville is a city in the U.S. state of Michigan and the county seat of Alcona County. The population was 493 at the 2010 census, making Harrisville the sixth-smallest city by population in the state of Michigan. The city is surrounded by Harrisville Township but is administratively autonomous.  Located on Lake Huron, it is an official Michigan Department of Natural Resources Harbor of Refuge.

History
The place was first known as Davison's Mill after Crosier Davison, who in partnership with Simeon Holden, had purchased land and water power rights here in 1854. Benjamin Harris and his sons, Levi and Henry, of West Bloomfield, New York bought out the partners. A post office established on September 16, 1857 was named Harrisville, with Levi as the first postmaster.

The Harris sold out to Weston, (George L.) Colwell & Company, who had H.G. Rothwell plat the community in 1870. Harrisville was incorporated as a village in 1887 and as a city in 1905.

Pizer's Variety Store, originally The White Store, was at the corner of Lake Street and Main Street.

Geography
It is considered to be part of Northern Michigan.

The city is on the western shore of Lake Huron and has a harbor for recreational boaters. The harbor is a center for salmon and trout fishing. It is also a designated "Harbor of Refuge" on Lake Huron by the United States Coast Guard.  The town also boasts Harrisville State Park, which includes a wooded campground along the beach. Sturgeon Point Light, a lighthouse and museum, is a few miles to the north, and is open to the public.

Harrisville is on the edge of Huron National Forest, which offers outdoor recreational opportunities such as hunting, swimming, cross-country skiing and trout fishing. The forest contains  of hiking trails. The Huron and Manistee National Forests were separately designated but were combined in 1945 for administrative purposes.

The Lake Huron beaches in and around Harrisville (including two state parks) have been recognized as being among the "top ten in Michigan." "Old-fashioned lake vacations abound on this pretty stretch of Lake Huron."

Harrisville is situated along the Lake State Railway, formerly the Detroit and Mackinac Railway (D&M). The D&M passenger depot is made of stone, which makes it one of two along the railway (the other being in Standish). It is privately maintained by local citizens as part of the municipality's historical legacy.

Demographics

2010 census
As of the census of 2010, there were 493 people, 231 households, and 130 families residing in the city. The racial makeup of the city was 96.6% White, 0.6% African American, 1.0% Native American, 0.2% Asian, 0.6% from other races, and 1.0% from two or more races. Hispanic or Latino of any race were 2.4% of the population.

There were 231 households, of which 18.2% had children under the age of 18 living with them, 42.4% were married couples living together, 11.7% had a female householder with no husband present, 2.2% had a male householder with no wife present, and 43.7% were non-families. 38.5% of all households were made up of individuals, and 20.3% had someone living alone who was 65 years of age or older. The average household size was 1.96 and the average family size was 2.55.

The median age in the city was 51.6 years. 16.4% of residents were under the age of 18; 5% were between the ages of 18 and 24; 20.2% were from 25 to 44; 29% were from 45 to 64; and 29.6% were 65 years of age or older. The gender makeup of the city was 45.0% male and 55.0% female.

2000 census
As of the census of 2000, there were 514 people, 239 households, and 131 families residing in the city. The racial makeup of the city was 94.94% White, 2.14% African American, 0.39% Native American, 0.97% Asian, and 1.56% from two or more races. Hispanic or Latino of any race were 0.97% of the population.

There were 239 households, out of which 18.4% had children under the age of 18 living with them, 44.4% were married couples living together, 8.4% had a female householder with no husband present, and 44.8% were non-families. 41.4% of all households were made up of individuals, and 22.6% had someone living alone who was 65 years of age or older. The average household size was 1.92 and the average family size was 2.57.

In the city, the population was spread out, with 16.0% under the age of 18, 7.4% from 18 to 24, 21.6% from 25 to 44, 25.9% from 45 to 64, and 29.2% who were 65 years of age or older. The median age was 48 years. For every 100 females, there were 96.2 males. For every 100 females age 18 and over, there were 93.7 males.

The median income for a household in the city was $27,500, and the median income for a family was $34,286. Males had a median income of $23,625 versus $21,875 for females. The per capita income for the city was $16,983. About 9.3% of families and 13.6% of the population were below the poverty line, including 20.8% of those under age 18 and 6.5% of those age 65 or over.

Transportation

Major highways
, north of Standish, it has been designated the Sunrise Side Coastal Highway, and runs along the Lake Huron shoreline. About  to the north is Mackinaw City and the Mackinac Bridge and the north end of the lower peninsula's I-75.
 In 1936, downtown Harrisville became the eastern terminus of the  M-72, which runs across the lower peninsula from Empire. It is one of three true cross-peninsular highways.

Bus
Indian Trails provides daily intercity bus service between St. Ignace and Bay City, Michigan.

Airport
Harrisville City Airport is 2200 feet (671 m) in length; it is located on Walker Road about a mile northwest of the city. A much larger public airport that serves the area and has nearly all weather capability is Oscoda–Wurtsmith Airport.

Local events
Harrisville is also home to the famous Glenview Clydesdales.  There is an annual Barbershop festival (Harmony Weekend) in the city, typically in early September.

Government

The following is a list of elected officials of Harrisville, as of December 2018:
 Mayor: John Dobis (R)
 Clerk: Barbara Pierce (R)
 Treasurer: Thomas Keerl (R)
 Alderman Ward I: Abigail Thomas (D)
 Alderman Ward I: Karen L. Sanderson (R)
 Alderman Ward II: Mary Peterson
 Alderman Ward II: James Kaiser (R)
 Alderman Ward III: Barbara Luenberger (R)
 Alderman Ward III: Michael Baird (R)
 Zoning Administrator: Troy Somers

Notable residents
 John T. Frederick, buried in Harrisville, professor of English literature University of Notre Dame and author many books including Green Bush. 
 Harrisville was the birthplace, hometown, and burial place of Hall of Fame baseball player Hazen Shirley "Kiki" Cuyler.  He is buried in Saint Anne Cemetery in neighboring Harrisville Township.  He is memorialized on a section of M-72 and in a local baseball field.  A local bar that he once owned, known as Ki Cuyler's Bar and Grill, was a prominent local establishment before it burned down in December 2018.

Media

Newspapers
 The Alcona County Review, located in Harrisville, is the newspaper of record, and has served the community since 1877.
 The Alpena News is the daily newspaper of record for much of northeastern Lower Peninsula of Michigan.
 Daily editions of the Detroit Free Press and The Detroit News are also available throughout the area.

Radio
 WXTF-LP

Further reading
  (including Harrisville)]

References

Sources

Cities in Alcona County, Michigan
County seats in Michigan
Populated places established in 1870
1870 establishments in Michigan
Populated places on Lake Huron in the United States